Marion Josserand (born October 6, 1986 in Saint-Martin d'Hères) is a French Olympic athlete in ski cross. She was a bronze medalist at the Olympic Games in Vancouver of the women's ski cross.

External links
Vancouver 2010 file

1986 births
Living people
French female freestyle skiers
Olympic freestyle skiers of France
Freestyle skiers at the 2010 Winter Olympics
Freestyle skiers at the 2014 Winter Olympics
Olympic bronze medalists for France
Olympic medalists in freestyle skiing
Medalists at the 2010 Winter Olympics